Marcelo Tomás Barrios Vera (born 10 December 1997), also known as Tomás Barrios, is a Chilean professional tennis player. Barrios has a career high ATP rankings in singles of World No. 124 achieved on 13 June 2022. He has won one Challenger title, at Meerbusch, Germany, in 2021. His best ranking in doubles is World No. 217 achieved on 28 February 2022.

Professional career

2021: Grand Slam debut, top 150 debut, first Challenger title
Barrios Vera reached his first challenger final in homesoil, at the Santiago challenger, but lost to Sebastián Báez.

He reached the final of the 2021 Almaty Challenger II losing to Jesper De Jong, which resulted in a career-high of No. 210 on 21 June 2021.

In the following week, Barrios qualified for his first Grand Slam at the 2021 Wimbledon Championships, where he lost to former finalist Kevin Anderson in the first round. As a result, he entered the top 200 reaching a career-high ranking of No. 194 on 12 July 2021.

Barrios qualified to represent Chile at the 2020 Summer Olympics. He lost in the first round to Jeremy Chardy.

In the following month, Barrios won his first challenger title at Meerbusch, Germany, beating Juan Manuel Cerúndolo in two sets at the final. The next day, he reached a new career-high ranking of No. 172 on 16 August 2021.

He finished the 2021 season ranked no. 147 in the singles rankings.

2023: First ATP quarterfinal 
He reached the quarterfinals at the 2023 Córdoba Open as a wildcard defeating Daniel Galan and eight seed Bernabe Zapata Miralles.

Davis Cup
Barrios Vera represents Chile in the Davis Cup. He was first nominated to the team for the 2017 Davis Cup and played in a match against Dominican tennis player José Olivares.

Performance timelines

Singles 
Current through the 2022 Davis Cup.

Doubles

Challenger and Futures/World Tennis Tour finals

Singles 19 (8–11)

Doubles

Davis Cup

Participations (2–5)

   indicates the outcome of the Davis Cup match followed by the score, date, place of event, the zonal classification and its phase, and the court surface.

Notes

References

External links
 
 
 

1997 births
Living people
Chilean male tennis players
Tennis players from Santiago
People from Chillán
South American Games gold medalists for Chile
South American Games medalists in tennis
Competitors at the 2018 South American Games
Pan American Games medalists in tennis
Pan American Games silver medalists for Chile
Tennis players at the 2019 Pan American Games
Medalists at the 2019 Pan American Games
Olympic tennis players of Chile
Tennis players at the 2020 Summer Olympics
20th-century Chilean people
21st-century Chilean people